Road 17 is a road in western Iran connecting Kermanshah via Islamabad-e-gharb and Eyvan to Ilam and to Mehran.

See also
Ghalajeh tunnel
Ghalajeh Protected Area

References

External links 

 Iran road map on Young Journalists Club

Roads in Iran